Oberlübber Bergsee is a lake in Kreis Minden-Lübbecke, North Rhine-Westphalia, Germany. At an elevation of 200 m, its surface area is ca. 0.8 ha.

Lakes of North Rhine-Westphalia
Wiehen Hills